Endozoicomonas ascidiicola is a Gram-negative, facultative anaerobic, chemoorganoheterotrophic, rod-shaped and motile bacterium from the genus of Endozoicomonas which has been isolated from a sea squirts (Ascidiella) from Gullmarsfjord in Sweden.

References

External links
Type strain of Endozoicomonas ascidiicola at BacDive -  the Bacterial Diversity Metadatabase

Oceanospirillales
Bacteria described in 2016